Hunan Botanical Garden, formerly known as Hunan Forest Botanical Garden, is a botanical garden and arboretum located in Yuhua District of Changsha, Hunan, China. It serves multiple functions, including botanical research, scientific education, exsitu conservation, exhibition, and tourism. It is also the only integrated organization for botanical research, conservation and utilization in Hunan.

History
Hunan Botanical Garden was established and opened to the public in 1985. In January 2012, it has been designated as an AAAA level tourist site by the China National Tourism Administration. 

In June 2021, it was renamed Hunan Botanical Garden.

Climate
It enjoys four distinct seasons, rain and heat over the same period, and abundant precipitation.

Gardens
 Cherry Garden
 Magnolia Garden
 Camellia Garden
 Rhododendron Garden
 World Famous Flowers Garden
 Shade tolerance Garden
 Bamboo Garden

Gallery

References

External links
 

Botanical gardens in Hunan
Parks in Changsha
Yuhua District, Changsha